Stamili Mbonde (born 21 June 1990) is a Tanzanian football striker who plays for Mtibwa Sugar.

References

1990 births
Living people
Tanzanian footballers
Tanzania international footballers
Ndanda F.C. players
Maji Maji F.C. players
Mtibwa Sugar F.C. players
Association football forwards
Tanzanian Premier League players